Federico Archuleta, also known as El Federico, is an Austin, Texas-based graffiti artist who has created several notable murals in Austin.

Archuleta draws on his Catholic upbringing as a first generation American in creating his works, including Lets Band Together and Virgen de Guadalupe. Most prominent are the stencil-graffiti portraits of Johnny Cash, Willie Nelson, the Clash and others on the old Tower Records/Varsity Theater building, as well as his portrait of Bob Dylan on the Hole in the Wall.

He was commissioned by Jarritos to create some murals in southern California.

References

External links
 El Federico's homepage
 

Culture of Austin, Texas
American graffiti artists
Artists from Austin, Texas
Living people
Year of birth missing (living people)